Helenodiscus is a genus of small air-breathing land snails, terrestrial pulmonate gastropod mollusks in the family Charopidae.

Species
Species within the genus Helenodiscus include:
 Helenodiscus bilamellata
 Helenodiscus vernoni

References

 
Charopidae
Taxonomy articles created by Polbot